The Avia S-199 is a propeller-driven Messerschmitt Bf 109G-based fighter aircraft built after World War II using the Bf 109G airframe and a Junkers Jumo 211F engine in place of the original and unavailable Daimler-Benz DB 605 engine.  It is notable as the first fighter obtained by the Israeli Air Force, and used during the 1948 Arab-Israeli War.

Constructed in Czechoslovakia, with parts and plans left over from Luftwaffe aircraft production, the aircraft had numerous problems and was generally unpopular with its pilots. Czechoslovak pilots nicknamed it Mezek ("Mule"), while in Israel, it was officially known as the Sakeen ("knife" in Hebrew). In practice, the aircraft was more often called Messerschmitt or Messer (which also means "knife", in German and Yiddish).

Design and development
 

Avia continued building Messerschmitt Bf 109G-6s after the war under the Avia S-99 name, at two aircraft factories in Czechoslovakia. 
One of them was officially called závod Avia (Avia Plant) (1946–48) and závod Avia-Jiřího Dimitrova (Avia-George Dimitroff-Plant, 1948–49) in Čakovice near Prague, as a postwar corporative part of the Automobilové závody, n.p. [Automotive Works, National Corp.]. The other was named závod Vysočany (Vysočany Plant, 1948–49) in Prague, as a corporative part of Letecké závody, n.p. [Aviation Works, National Corp.],  but soon ran out of the 109's Daimler-Benz DB 605 engines after many were destroyed during an explosion at a warehouse in Krásné Březno.

The S-199 continued to use the Bf 109G airframe, but with none of the original engines available, an alternative engine had to be used. As a replacement for the original engine, the aircraft would use the same (Junkers Jumo 211F) engine and propeller as the Heinkel He 111 bomber. The resulting combination of parts was an aircraft with extremely poor handling qualities. The substitute engine with the propeller lacked the responsiveness of the Daimler-Benz unit and the torque created by the massive paddle-bladed propeller made control very difficult. This, in combination with the 109's narrow-track undercarriage, made landings and takeoffs extremely hazardous.

The Daimler-Benz DB 605 engine allowed for a central cannon mount (Motorkanone in German) that fired through the propeller spinner. This was not possible with the Junkers Jumo 211, so the S-199 used a version of the Luftwaffe's Rüstsatz VI modification kit, which consisted of a pair of MG 151 cannons, one each in a gun pod, beneath each wing — this further impaired the aircraft's performance.  A final hidden danger lay in the gun synchronizer for the cowl-mounted MG 131 machine guns, which did not work as meant to, leading a few Israeli aircraft to shoot off their own propellers.

Around 550 S-199s were built, including a number of conversion trainers designated CS-199 (armed) and C-210 (unarmed). The first flight took place in March 1947, and production ended in 1949. The last examples were withdrawn from Czechoslovak service (with their National Security Guard) in 1957.

Operational history

Israeli service

Israeli agents negotiated the purchase of Avia S-199s from the Czechoslovak government in defiance of an arms embargo that Israel faced at the time. Twenty-five aircraft were obtained and all but two were eventually delivered. The price for a fully equipped plane was $190,000. The first four examples arrived on 20 May 1948, six days after Israel's declaration of independence and five days after the commencement of hostilities by Egypt. Forming Israel's first fighter squadron, the four Avias were assembled and sent into combat for the first time on 29 May during Operation Pleshet, attacking the Egyptian army between Isdud and the Ad Halom bridge, south of Tel Aviv. A few days later, on 3 June, taking off from Herzliya Airport the type scored the Israeli Air Force's first aerial victories when Modi Alon shot down two Royal Egyptian Air Force C-47s, which had just bombed Tel Aviv.

The type proved unreliable and performed poorly in combat. Furthermore, maintenance problems meant that no more than five were typically airworthy at any one time. The type scored victories over its opponents, including the Spitfire. The Avias were mostly withheld from service by the end of October, when only six remained operational. The S-199 continued making sporadic sorties until mid-December.

Variants

Avia S-99
A Messerschmitt Bf 109G-10 variant assembled postwar in Czechoslovakia, its Avia factory designation was C.10; 21 aircraft were completed.
Avia CS-99
A training variant of Avia S-99 based on the Bf 109G-12 variant, its  Avia factory designation was C.10: 23 aircraft were completed.
Avia S-199
The Avia S-99 powered by the Junkers Jumo 211F engine was the main production variant. Its Avia factory designation was C.210, and 559 aircraft were completed.
Avia CS-199
This two-seat training variant was rebuilt from the Avia S-199.
Avia D-199
 A reconnaissance version

Operators

Czechoslovak Air Force
Czechoslovak National Security Guard

Israeli Air Force
101 Squadron

Surviving aircraft
Czech Republic
 UC-26 – CS-199 - is on static display at the Kbely Aviation Museum in Kbely, Prague. It is serial number 565. 
 UF-25 – S-199 - is on static display at the Prague Aviation Museum in Kbely, Prague. It is serial number 178.

Israel
 D-112 – S-199 - is on static display at the Israeli Air Force Museum at Hatzerim Israeli Air Force Base near Hatzerim, South District.

Specifications (S-199)

See also

References

External links

 .
101 Squadron's Avia S-199s
 Valka.cz forum with more pictures and further information

Avia S-199, Jewish Virtual Library

S-199
1940s Czechoslovakian fighter aircraft
Single-engined tractor aircraft
Low-wing aircraft
Messerschmitt Bf 109
Aircraft first flown in 1947